Charlotte Harding (1873–1951) was an American illustrator. She signed her work with her maiden name, but her name in her personal life was Charlotte Harding Brown after she married James A. Brown in 1905. She illustrated magazines, such as The Saturday Evening Post and Harper's Bazaar, and books such as Robin Hood.

Early life
Harding was born in Newark, New Jersey, on August 31, 1873, the daughter of Joseph and Charlotte Elizabeth Harding.  Harding lived in Philadelphia beginning in 1880 and attended public schools there. Her younger brother, George Matthews Harding, also became an artist and illustrator.

Education
Harding studied from 1893 to 1894 under Robert Henri at the Philadelphia School of Design for Women, where she won the George W. Childs gold medal and  the Horstman Fellowship. The following year she was an instructor at the school. She received a fellowship and continued her studies at the Pennsylvania Academy of the Fine Arts from 1894 to 1895 and under Howard Pyle at the Drexel Institute of Illustration from 1894 to 1900. Harding is identified as one of Pyle's first and noted students. Her works were exhibited at Drexel in 1897 and 1898, one of which was commissioned for a manuscript.

Career
 
After she completed her studies at Drexel, Harding set up a studio in Philadelphia with Alice Barber Stephens. Harding illustrated for a number of magazines, including Good Housekeeping, Harper's Bazaar, The Ladies' Home Journal, McClure's Magazine, The Saturday Evening Post, and The Century Magazine.

She was one of the artists to contribute to the Golden Age of Illustration (1890–1920). Other women who made significant contributions to the movement and illustrated "important British and American books", according to author Catherine Golden, were Jessie Willcox Smith, Elizabeth Shippen Green, and Violet Oakley. Harding's illustration, Algy, was made for a poem about a boy who would rather have kisses from his mother than the family dog.

Harding was a founding member of The Plastic Club in 1897 and was a member there until 1913 and was a member of the Philadelphia Watercolor Club. In 1900 she received silver medals at the Woman's Exposition in London and received honors and prizes at the 1915 St. Louis Exposition and other exhibitions. She continued to sign her works "Carolyn Harding" after her marriage in 1905. She had a studio and lived in Holmesburg, Philadelphia. Harding stopped illustrating in 1917.

Personal life
Harding married James Adams Brown, an engineer, in 1905. She died on November 1, 1951, in Smithtown, New York. They had a daughter, Charlotte Adams Brown.

Works

References

Further reading

External links

 
 
 

1873 births
1951 deaths
American women illustrators
Pennsylvania Academy of the Fine Arts alumni
American children's book illustrators
20th-century illustrators of fairy tales
Philadelphia School of Design for Women alumni